The Mombasa International Marathon (formerly known as the Mombasa Marathon) is an annual marathon hosted in Mombasa, Kenya.  Currently sponsored by County Government of Mombasa and Safaricom. This year the marathon prize money has been increased for the 42 km to KSh.1.5 million/= and introduced KSh.700,000/= for the 10 km. with the course's start and finish lines at Treasury Square in the city's Old Town area.

History 
The marathon was first run in 1985, though winner statistics for the 1985–1988 races are unknown.  Daniel Nzioka holds the record for most men's wins, with 3 (1988–1991).  Grace Chebet holds the record for most women's wins, also with 3 (1995, 1998–99).

The total prize fund for the 2010 race was KSh.816,000/= (£6,308.40 sterling), with the winner's prize in both men's and women's categories standing at KSh.200,000/= (£1,546.18 stg). The winners of the 2010 race were James Kariuki Mbugua and Tabitha Kibet, with times of 02:08:05 and 02:36:04 respectively.

Past winners
Key:
 • Short course • † = Long course

Course discrepancies 
Since 1999, the course route has been shorter than standard. During the 2004 race, the runners went off-course; reports suggested that the runners may have covered an additional .

References 

Marathons in Kenya
Sport in Mombasa
Recurring sporting events established in 1985
1985 establishments in Kenya